Periférico Norte is the second station of Line 1 of the Guadalajara light rail system from north to south, and the nineteenth in the opposite direction. This station is underground.

The station is under the intersection of the Calzada Federalismo with the North Peripheral Ring (Spanish: Anillo Periférico Norte), to which its name alludes. This station is located in a strategic area, since it connects with various bus routes that meet the demand of the municipalities of Zapopan, Guadalajara, Tonalá and Tlaquepaque.

Its logo represents a ring divided into two poles with the upper one highlighted, indicating that it is north.

History  

Originally, the Periferico Norte station was overground, but when the Line 1 expansion works began in August 2014, the station was demolished to build a more modern one under the North Peripheral Ring, along with an underpass for cars that circulate on Calzada Federalismo. The new station was opened on September 16, 2017, and more than a year later, on 22 November 2018, the new terminal of Line 1 was inaugurated: the Auditorio station, located 1 km north from the Periferico Norte station.

Accidents 
On January 26, 2015, a collision between two trains was recorded when the driver of the vehicle T-06 was driving without due caution and care, since he had the distance and time to avoid the collision and did not brake in time. It was a mishap between trains caused by a communication error between the drivers and the dispatcher.

Points of interest 
 Benito Juárez Auditorium
 González Ortega Housing Unit.

Transport routes nearby 
 Periférico Norte station of Mi Macro Periférico

References

Guadalajara light rail system Line 1 stations
Railway stations opened in 1989
Railway stations located underground in Mexico
Railway stations in Guadalajara
Railway stations opened in 2017